The 2017–18 Arkansas State Red Wolves men's basketball team represented Arkansas State University during the 2017–18 NCAA Division I men's basketball season. The Red Wolves, led by first-year head coach Mike Balado, played their home games at the First National Bank Arena in Jonesboro, Arkansas as members of the Sun Belt Conference. They finished the season 11–21, 6–12 in Sun Belt play to finish in 11th place. They lost in the first round of the Sun Belt tournament to Louisiana–Monroe.

Previous season
The Red Wolves finished the 2016–17 season 20–12, 11–7 in Sun Belt play to finish in a three-way tie for third place. As the No. 5 seed in the Sun Belt tournament, they lost to Louisiana–Monroe in the first round. Despite having 20 wins, they did not participate in a postseason tournament.

On March 13, 2017, head coach Grant McCasland left the school to accept the head coaching position at North Texas. On March 20, the school named Louisville assistant Mike Balado as their new head coach.

Roster

Schedule and results

|-
!colspan=9 style=| Non-conference regular season

|-
!colspan=9 style=| Sun Belt Conference regular season

|-
!colspan=9 style=| Sun Belt tournament

References

Arkansas State Red Wolves men's basketball seasons
Arkansas State
Arkansas State
Arkansas State